Make-Out with Violence is a 2008 film directed by the Deagol Brothers, their first feature-length film.

Plot synopsis

The film tells the story of twin brothers Patrick and Carol Darling, newly graduated from high school and struggling to come to terms with the mysterious disappearance of their friend, the bright and beautiful Wendy Hearst. When a drive through the countryside surrounding their posh suburban community leads to the discovery of Wendy's mysteriously animated corpse, the boys secretly transport the zombie Wendy to an empty house in hopes of somehow bringing her back to life. As the sweltering summer pushes on, they must maintain the appearance of normalcy for their friends and family as they search for ways to revive the Wendy they once knew, or, failing that, to satisfy their own quests for love amongst the living and the dead.

Soundtrack
 The film features an entirely original score comprising Brian Eno-inspired pop songs, as well as a few more ambient tracks. Written mostly by brothers Jordan and Eric Lehning under the moniker of The Non-Commissioned Officers, the soundtrack also features various Nashville-local artists such as The Glib, Tristen, Leah High, Vicki Mead, The Ostrich Boys, and Amanda Crawford.

The writing of the soundtrack actually began before the writing of the script.  In the Spring of 2004, around the same time that work on the actual screenplay began, Jordan and Eric Lehning got together to begin work on the soundtrack to the film.  The two met in Boston where Jordan was attending Berklee College of Music, and created a few songs for the movie, with the idea that the musical themes would help sculpt the story of the film itself.  Many of the songs created during this time made it onto the final soundtrack when it was released 5 years later, including "No Means No," "Sweet Eleanor," and "Flour."

The 2-disc, 44-song soundtrack was independently released in March 2009, coinciding with the film's showings at the 2009 South by Southwest Film Festival.  It can currently only be purchased online through the film's Web site for $15 or in a small amount of independent music stores across the country.

Release
The film premiered at the 2008 Atlanta Film Festival, where it won the Grand Jury Prize for Best Narrative Feature.

Festivals
The film has played at many festivals around the world, including the following:

Atlanta Film Festival
Sidewalk Moving Picture Festival
Maryland Film Festival
Indie Memphis Film Festival 2008
Oxford (Mississippi) Film Festival 2009
Boulder International Film Festival
San Francisco Independent Film Festival
Magnolia Independent Film Festival
South by Southwest Film Festival
Salem Film Festival
Independent Film Festival of Boston
Nashville Film Festival

Awards
 Atlanta Film Festival 2008 - Grand Jury Prize for Best Narrative Feature
 Indie Memphis Film Festival 2008 - Ron Tibbett Excellence in Filmmaking Award
 Oxford Film Festival 2009 - Jury Award for Best Narrative Feature
 Magnolia Independent Film Festival 2009 - Best Feature Film
 Nashville Film Festival 2009 - Regal Cinemas/Nashville Film Festival Dreammaker Award for Best Narrative Feature
 Nashville Film Festival 2009 - Tennessee Independent Spirit Award
 Nashville Film Festival 2009 - Best Music in a Feature Film 
 Fantastique Semaine du Cinema 2010 - "Special Mention"

References

External links
Official Facebook

2008 films
2008 horror films
American comedy horror films
Films set in Tennessee
Films shot in Tennessee
2000s English-language films
2000s American films